Sour Municipal Stadium is a multi-use stadium in Tyre, Lebanon. It is used mostly for football matches and serves as the home for Tadamon Sour and Salam Sour. The stadium was built in 1947 and holds 6,500 people.

References 

Football venues in Lebanon
Sports venues in Lebanon